Celine Elaiza Domingo (born April 20, 1999) is a Filipino volleyball player who currently plays for the Creamline Cool Smashers in the Premier Volleyball League. She was the team captain of the Philippines women's national under-23 volleyball team that competed in the 2019 Women's Volleyball Kor Royal Cup held in Thailand.

Clubs 
  PayMaya High Flyers (2018)
  Smart Giga Hitters (2018)
  Creamline Cool Smashers (2019-present)

Awards

Individual
 2018 UAAP Season 80 "Best Blocker"
 2018 Premier Volleyball League Collegiate Conference "1st Best Middle Blocker"
 2022 Premier Volleyball League Invitational Conference "Final's Most Valuable Player"

References 

1999 births
Living people
Middle blockers
University Athletic Association of the Philippines volleyball players
Philippines women's international volleyball players
Far Eastern University alumni
Filipino women's volleyball players
21st-century Filipino women